Themes is a compilation album of works by Greek electronic composer and artist Vangelis released in July 1989. It featured some previously released tracks from Vangelis's other albums, as well as some pieces from movie soundtracks that had not previously been released.

The album is notable because it marked the first official appearances of Vangelis' music from the films Blade Runner, The Bounty, and Missing. Of these three film scores, only the Blade Runner soundtrack has since received an official release.

Track listing

Charts

Certifications

References

1989 compilation albums
Vangelis compilation albums